Red Deer-South is a provincial electoral district for the Legislative Assembly of Alberta, Canada.

The district was created from Red Deer in 1986.
Under the Alberta electoral boundary re-distribution of 2004, the constituency borders Red Deer North at the Red Deer River, Taylor Drive, Ross Street, 30th Avenue and 39th Street.  At the city limits, the constituency is bounded by Innisfail-Sylvan Lake.

The current MLA for this district is Jason Stephan from the United Conservative Party.

History
The electoral district was created in the 1985 boundary redistribution from the Red Deer provincial electoral district. The city of Red Deer had been contained in a single electoral district since 1888 when it first started returning members to the Legislative Assembly of the Northwest Territories. The city was split into South and Red Deer-North.

The 2010 boundary redistribution saw adjustments made to the boundary with Red Deer-North to equalize the population between the two constituencies.

Boundary history

Representation history
Since the electoral district was created in 1986, the voters of Red Deer-South have returned Progressive Conservative candidates in every election until 2015, joining the province-wide NDP victory. The first representative was John Oldring who served two terms in office. He served as a cabinet minister in the government of Don Getty in his second term and retired in 1993 after a failed leadership bid for the Progressive Conservative Party.

Victor Doerksen was the second MLA for the district. He was first elected in 1993 after a very hotly contested election with a Liberal candidate. He would eke out his second term in 1997 facing another strong challenge from the Liberals. His third term would be won with the highest popular vote in the history of the riding. He would be appointed to cabinet in the government of Ralph Klein shortly after the election and hold his portfolio until 2006 when he resigned to run for leadership of the Progressive Conservatives. After his bid for leadership failed he retired from office in 2008.

The next representative was Cal Dallas, elected to his first term in 2008. He was appointed Minister of International and Intergovernmental Relations by Premier Allison Redford in October 2011.

Legislature results

1986 general election

1989 general election

1993 general election

1997 general election

2001 general election

2004 general election

Results of the Separation Party compared to Alberta First Party

2008 general election

2012 general election

2015 general election

2019 general election

Voter turnout was 72 percent.

Senate nominee results

2004 Senate nominee election district results
Voters had the option of selecting four candidates on the ballot.

2012 Senate nominee election district results
Voters had the option of selecting three candidates on the ballot.

Student vote results

2004 election

On November 19, 2004 a student vote was conducted at participating Alberta schools to parallel the 2004 Alberta general election results. The vote was designed to educate students and simulate the electoral process for persons who had not yet reached the legal majority. The vote was conducted in 80 of the 83 provincial electoral districts with students voting for actual election candidates. Schools with a large student body who reside in another electoral district had the option to vote for candidates outside of the electoral district than where they were physically located.

2012 election

During the week of April 16, 2012 - April 20, 2012 a student vote was conducted at participating Alberta schools to parallel the 2012 Alberta general election results. The vote was designed to educate students and simulate the electoral process for persons who had not yet reached the legal majority. The vote was conducted in 86 of the 87 provincial electoral districts with students voting for actual election candidates. Students from École Secondaire Notre Dame High School participated in the vote on April 19, 2012.

References

External links 
Website of the Legislative Assembly of Alberta

Alberta provincial electoral districts
Politics of Red Deer, Alberta
1986 establishments in Alberta